Ryan David Valentine (born 19 August 1982) is a Welsh footballer who plays as a defender for Bala Town.

Club career
Valentine signed for Wrexham on a free transfer after leaving Darlington in the summer of 2006. 

Despite a sending off against Bury on 9 March 2007, Valentine played well for Wrexham. He played a vital part in their bid for survival, scoring the penalty in Wrexham's must win game on 5 May 2007 against Boston United which levelled the score at 1–1. Wrexham won the game 3–1 and stayed in the Football League. It was announced on 18 January 2008 that he has left Wrexham and rejoined his former club Darlington. On 29 May 2009 Valentine signed a one-year deal at League Two side Hereford United. Valentine later agreed a further year on his Hereford contract. After an injury hit season which kept him out for 5 months he was told at the end of the season that his contract would not be renewed at Hereford.

On 30 June 2011 he signed a one-year deal at AFC Telford United. Then at the end of the 2011–12 season he signed a new one-year contract with AFC Telford United. On 11 May 2013 it was announced he was released by Telford with five other players.

On 8 June 2013, Ryan was announced as a new signing for Bala Town, in the Welsh Premier League. He will be eligible to compete for the club in their first ever European fixtures in the qualifying rounds of the Europa League.

International career
Valentine played well in the 2006–07 season and got called up to the Wales national football team to face the Czech Republic and Brazil, and again to play Northern Ireland, but has yet to earn a cap.

References

External links

1982 births
Living people
Footballers from Wrexham
Welsh footballers
Wales under-21 international footballers
Association football defenders
Everton F.C. players
Darlington F.C. players
Wrexham A.F.C. players
Hereford United F.C. players
AFC Telford United players
English Football League players
National League (English football) players
Bala Town F.C. players
Cymru Premier players